The Church of Santa María a Real do Sar (Galician: Igrexa de Santa María a Real do Sar) is a church located in Santiago de Compostela, Spain. It was declared Bien de Interés Cultural in 1895.The church lies on the banks of the Sar river, which flows past Santiago.

References

See also 

 List of Bien de Interés Cultural in the Province of A Coruña

Bien de Interés Cultural landmarks in the Province of A Coruña
Churches in Galicia (Spain)